Bodil Jørgensen (born 3 March 1961) is a Danish film actress. She has appeared in 40 films since 1992. She starred in The Idiots, which was entered into the 1998 Cannes Film Festival. On 18 June 2014, Jørgensen was severely injured while shooting for the film Far til fires vilde ferie on the island of Mandø. She fell off a tractor she was riding in the scene being filmed, and was crushed by it. Severe injuries to her ribs, pelvis and internal organs ensued, but she survived the accident.

Selected filmography

 Planetens spejle (1992) - Videnskabskvinden (Scientist)
 Russian Pizza Blues (1992)
 Alletiders nisse (1995, TV Series) - Bibliotekar
 Kun en pige (1995) - Gudrun
 Sunes familie (1997) - Sygeplejerske
 Nonnebørn (1997) - Søster Augustina / Sister Augustina
 Strisser på Samsø (1997–1998, TV Series) - Bodega-Bodil
 Idioterne (1998) - Karen
 Klinkevals (1999) - Josephine
 Juliane (2000) - Josephine
 Fruen på Hamre (2000) - Bente
 Send mere slik (2001) - Lissi Grise Knud
 At klappe med een hånd (2001) - Enke
 De Grønne Slagtere (2003) - Tina
 Jesus & Josefine (2003, TV Series) - Jytte
 Silkevejen (2004) - Ellen - Christine's friend and Colleague
 Krøniken (2004–2006, TV Series) - Astrid Nørregaard
 Anklaget (2005) - Skolepsykolog
 Voksne mennesker (2005) - Gunvor
 Jul i Valhal (2005, TV Series) - Sif
 Der var engang en dreng (2006) - Karin fra kommunen
 Hjemve (2007) - Myrtle
 De unge år (2007) - Katrine Bonfils
 Til døden os skiller (2007) - Nurse
 Frode og alle de andre rødder (2008) - Fru Rask
 Album (2008, TV Series) - Musse Rolsted
 Terribly Happy (2008) - Bartender
 Troubled Water (2008) - Dansk Kone
 Se min kjole (2009) - Mor
 Winnie og Karina - The Movie (2009) - Gerda
 Oldboys (2009) - Bente
 Karla og Jonas (2010) - Kattedame
 In a Better World (2010) - Rektor
 Nothing's All Bad (2010) - Ingeborg
 Jensen & Jensen (2011) - Fru Jensen (voice)
 Ronal the Barbarian (2011) - Bar Fairy (voice)
 This Life (2012) - Gudrun Fiil
 Gummi T (2012) - Fru Helmer / Gammel Dame (voice)
 Den skaldede frisør (2012) - Vibe
 Otto the Rhino (2013) - Fru Flora (voice)
 Badehotellet (2013-2021, TV Series) - Molly Andersen
 Far til fire - Onkel Sofus vender tilbage (2014) - Fru Sejersen
 A Second Chance (2014) - Retsmediciner
 Serena (2014) - Mrs. Sloan
 All Inclusive (2014) - Lise
 Men & Chicken (2015) - Ellen
 People Get Eaten (2015) - Ingelise
 Albert (2015) - Tahira (voice)
 Parents (2016) - Vibeke / mother
 Den magiske juleæske (2016) - Inger (voice)
 Aldrig mere i morgen (2017) - Englen
 Vitello (2018) - Georgine Dame (voice)
 Kollision (2019) - Elin
 De forbandede år (2020) - Eva Skov
 Hvor kragerne vender (2021) - Jane
 Riget: Exodus - Karen Svensson

References

External links

1961 births
Living people
Danish film actresses
Best Actress Bodil Award winners
People from Vejle Municipality
Best Actress Robert Award winners